Sabrina Mahfouz  is a British-Egyptian poet, playwright, performer and writer from South London, England. Her published work includes poetry, plays and contributions to several anthologies.

Education
Mahfouz earned a BA in English Literature and Classics at King's College London and an MA in International Politics and Diplomacy at SOAS, University of London.

Career
Mahfouz began her career in the Civil Service Fast Stream Programme, working with the Ministry of Defence and other departments. She left the Civil Service to concentrate on creative writing and won a Westminster Prize for New Playwrights in 2010 for her first short play, That Boy, which was performed at the Soho Theatre, London.

Mahfouz's poetry work and performances earned her a Creative in Residence Award in 2011 at The Hospital Club in London.She was invited to New York with the Old Vic New Voices TS Eliot exchange program in 2011 and later that year produced her first solo show, Dry Ice, which premiered at Underbelly during Edinburgh Festival 2011. Dry Ice was directed by David Schwimmer, receiving critical acclaim and a nomination for The Stage Award for Best Solo Performance. It later transferred to The Bush Theatre in London and Contact Theatre in Manchester.

Her play One Hour Only was chosen by Old Vic New Voices and IdeasTap for their Edinburgh Award and played at the Underbelly in 2012. That year, she also wrote a short play called Clean for Traverse Theatre as part of The Breakfast Plays 2012, which won a Herald Angel Award. In 2013, Clean was commissioned as a longer piece and played at Traverse Theatre and Oran Mor in Glasgow, transferring to 59e59 Theater in New York during 2014.

Mahfouz was awarded a Sky Academy Arts Scholarship in 2013, allowing her to produce new poetry work which was collected in a book The Clean Collection, published by Bloomsbury. The scholarship also enabled her to produce and write a new theatre show called Chef which played at Underbelly in 2014 and transferred to Soho Theatre in June 2015.

Chef won a Fringe First Award and was nominated for the Carol Tambor Best of Edinburgh Award; the Brighton Fringe Award for Excellence and the  Holden Street Theatres' Adelaide Fringe Award. The performer was Jade Anouka, who received The Stage Award for Acting Excellence.

In 2014, her play about free speech in Egypt was commissioned by and performed at The National Theatre by young people for the annual National Theatre Connections Festival.

In 2016, Mahfouz had a short television drama piece called Breaking the Code produced by BBC3, BBC Taster and BBC Drama and the following plays written by her were produced in the UK and internationally: With a Little Bit of Luck (Paines Plough); SLUG (nabokov); the love i feel is red (Tobacco Factory Theatre); Caldarium (Theatre Uncut/Teater Grob); SLoW (KVS Brussels); Layla's Room (Theatre Centre) and Battleface (Bush Theatre).

Mahfouz has been a Playwright in Residence at the Bush Theatre; Poet in Residence at Cape Farewell, a Writer at Liberty for Liberty UK and a Global Shaper with the World Economic Forum.

Political views
In December 2019, along with 42 other leading cultural figures, Mahfouz signed a letter endorsing the Labour Party under Jeremy Corbyn's leadership in the 2019 general election. The letter stated that "Labour's election manifesto under Jeremy Corbyn's leadership offers a transformative plan that priorities the needs of people and the planet over private profit and the vested interests of a few."

Books

Poetry
How You Might Know Me / Full Collection (Out-Spoken Press, 2016)
Craft of Use by Kate Fletcher / 1 Poem (Routledge, 2016)
Out-Spoken Anthology 2015 / 3 poems (Out-Spoken Press, 2015)

Playscripts
Layla's Room (Methuen Bloomsbury, 2016)
With a Little Bit of Luck (Methuen Bloomsbury, 2016)
New Monologues for Women edited by Geoffrey Colman / 2 texts (Methuen Bloomsbury, 2016)
National Theatre Connections Monologues edited by Anthony Banks / 1 text (Methuen Bloomsbury, 2016)
Audition Speeches for Black, Middle Eastern and South Asian Actors edited by Simelia Hodge-Dalloway / 2 texts (Methuen Bloomsbury, 2016)
Chef (Methuen Bloomsbury, 2015)
National Theatre Connections, Plays for Young People edited by Anthony Banks / 1 play (Methuen Bloomsbury, 2014)
The Clean Collection (Methuen Bloomsbury, 2014)

Fiction
Here I Stand edited by Amnesty International / 1 story (Walker Books, 2016)

Non-fiction
The Good Immigrant edited by Nikesh Shukla / 1 essay (Unbound, 2016)

As editor
 The Things I Would Tell You: British Muslim Women Write (Saqi Books, 2017)

Plays 
Noughts & Crosses (2019, Pilot Theatre) 
The Things I Would Tell You (co-writer with Aliyah Hashanah Holder, Nafeesa Hamid, Aisha Mirza, 2018, Traverse Theatre)
This is How It Is (2018, Fuel Theatre)
The Power of Plumbing (2018, Theatre Uncut)
Ziraffa Giraffa (2017, Little Angel / Omnibus)
Beweep, Outcast (2017, CSSD)
Offside (co-writer with Hollie McNish, 2017, Futures Theatre)
Battleface (2016, Bush Theatre) 
SLUG (2016, nabakov)
the love i feel is red (2016, Tobacco Factory Theatres)
With a Little Bit of Luck (2016, Paines Plough)
Layla's Room (2016, Theatre Centre)
Caladarium (2016, Theatre Uncut / Teater Grob)
Chef (2015, Just for Laughs Theatricals / 2014, P.O.P)
A Shop Selling Speech (2013, National Theatre Connections)
Disnatured (2013, Shakespeare in Shoreditch)
Clean (2013, Traverse Theatre) 
One Hour Only (2012, Made From Scratch Theatre / Old Vic New Voices)
Dry Ice (2011, SM / 2012, Bush Theatre)

TV
Railway Nation: A Journey In Verse (BBC TWO / Blast! Films)
We Belong Here (BBC iPlayer / The Space) 
Breaking the Code (BBC3 / BBC Taster / BBC Drama)
After The DG (CBBC)

Film
Alone Together (BBC iPlayer / Decapo)
Sabrina Mahfouz: Spoken Word (Sky Arts)

Radio
Power Lines (Presenter on Performance Poetry Documentary, BBC Radio 4)
A Century of Results (Short Story, BBC Radio 4/Shortworks)
With a Little Bit of Luck (Radio Play, BBC Radio 1xtra)
I Go to Her Wardrobe (Short Story, BBC Radio 4/Shortworks)

Dance
Rosalind (James Cousins Company)
I Imagine (Aakash Odedra Company) 
The Dying Swan (Royal Ballet)

Opera
Woman at Point Zero (Bushra El-Turk / Royal Opera House / Snape Maltings / Shubbak)
Paws & Padlocks (Kate Whitley / Blackheath Halls)
I Am I Say (Kate Whitley / Multi-Story Orchestra)
The Cruel Cut (Kate Whitley) 
Sancerre (K. Wilmslow / Royal Opera House)

Awards and honours

References

External links
 Official website.

Living people
Alumni of King's College London
Alumni of SOAS University of London
21st-century English poets
21st-century Egyptian poets
Writers from London
People from London
English people of Egyptian descent
English women poets
Egyptian women poets
Year of birth missing (living people)
20th-century Egyptian women
Fellows of the Royal Society of Literature
21st-century English women writers